Carnival of Schadenfreude is the twelfth E.P. by Chicago punk rock band Screeching Weasel.

Track listing

Lineup
Ben Weasel - vocals
 Zac Damon - guitar
 Dave Klein - bass
 Pierre Marche - drums

2011 EPs
Screeching Weasel EPs